Census Division No. 13 (Selkirk Area) is a census division located within the Interlake Region of the province of Manitoba, Canada. Unlike in some other provinces, census divisions do not reflect the organization of local government in Manitoba. These areas exist solely for the purposes of statistical analysis and presentation; they have no government of their own. 

The City of Selkirk, Manitoba is the major service centre for the area. The economy of the division is manufacturing, agriculture and tourism and it is a bedroom community for the City of Winnipeg. The population of the division was 44,829 as of the 2006 census. Also included in the division is the main reserve (Brokenhead 4) of the Brokenhead Ojibway Nation.

Demographics 

Cities

 Selkirk

Villages
 Dunnottar

Rural municipalities
 East St. Paul
 St. Andrews
 St. Clements
 West St. Paul

References

External links
 Manitoba Community Profiles: Selkirk Area

13